Laciana, Tsaciana in Leonese language, is a comarca in the province of León, Spain. It had 11,904 inhabitants in 2005. The rivers of this comarca flow towards the Atlantic Ocean. Local people speak a certain variant of the Leonese language known as Patsuezo.

Many areas in Laciana were degraded in the past by open-pit mining and mining-related contamination. This comarca was declared a Biosphere Reserve in 2003.

Language

The predominant language is Castilian which coexists with the native Leon variant   known as the Patsuezu language. Despite being endangered, there are various efforts being made to revitalize the traditional dialect of the area. A book entitled Street Cries of the Villablino Festivals by Emilce Núñez was written about these efforts.

Economy
The region is an eminently mining region that has been hit by the economic crisis. Now it is committed to finding economic alternatives for the future. It is the headquarters of the steel mining companies Ponferrada, 8 HCCSA and 9 HBG (Hijos de Baldomero Garcia Viloria Group.

Biological reserve

On July 10, 2003, Laciana Valley was officially declared a Biosphere Reserve.

Furthermore, the Laciana Biosphere Reserve Laciana is included within the project Plan of Natural Resources Management of the Natural Area Sierra de Ancares to extend the area of involvement due to the size of the populations of grouse and bear.

The biosphere reserve of Laciana includes 21,700 hectares of the region, divided into several zones according to their ecological interest:

Municipalities
Villablino is the main municipality. It has the following villages within its term:
 Villaseca de Laciana es
 Caboalles de Abajo
 Caboalles de Arriba
 Villager de Laciana
 Orallo
 Rioscuro de Laciana
 Robles de Laciana
 Sosas de Laciana
Lumajo
Villar de Laciana
Rabanal de Abajo
Rabanal de Arriba
Llamas de Laciana

External links 

 Pagina Oficial del Ayuntamiento de Villablino (Comarca de Laciana)
La provincia de León y sus comarcas - Laciana
 Babia
 Servicio de bicicletas para Babia y Laciana
 Página oficial de Caboalles de Abajo
 Página Oficial de la Reserva de la Biosfera de Laciana
 Página web de interés medioambiental,fauna de esta comarca
 Los Verdes de Laciana
 Laciana, "territorio comanche", en El Escarabajo Verde de TVE.

References

Comarcas of the Province of León